The Bank of Fairhope, at 396 Fairhope Ave. in Fairhope, Alabama, was built in 1927.  It was listed on the National Register of Historic Places in 1988.

It has also been known as the Press Register Building.  It was designed by Mobile architect William March in Classical Revival style. It was built of hollow clay tile supplied by the Clay Products Company, a local firm.

References

Bank buildings on the National Register of Historic Places in Alabama
National Register of Historic Places in Baldwin County, Alabama
Neoclassical architecture in Alabama
Buildings and structures completed in 1927